Marionia is a genus of sea slugs, specifically dendronotid nudibranchs, marine gastropod molluscs in the family Tritoniidae.

Species 
Species within the genus Marionia include:

 
Species brought into synonymy
 Marionia affinis Bergh, 1883: synonym of Marionia blainvillea (Risso, 1818) (synonym)
 Marionia berghii Vayssière, 1879: synonym of Marionia blainvillea (Risso, 1818) (synonym)
 Marionia occidentalis Bergh, 1884: synonym of  Marionia cucullata (Couthouy, 1852)
 Marionia tethydea [sic]: synonym of Marionia blainvillea (Risso, 1818) (misspelling of thethydea (Delle Chiaje, 1841))

References

Tritoniidae